Lise Bourbeau (born 14 February 1941, in Richmond, Quebec) is a French Canadian writer who is best known for writing self help books. She has published more than 20 books in French and English.

References 

1941 births
Living people
Canadian self-help writers